This is a list of airlines currently operating in Vanuatu.

See also
 List of defunct airlines of Vanuatu

Vanuatu
Vanuatu

Airlines